The 2006 Chadian coup d'état attempt was an attempted coup d'état against Chadian President Idriss Déby that was foiled on the night of March 14, 2006.

Plot
The coup involved members of the Chadian military, led by brothers Tom and Timane Erdimi, two high-ranking officers who had tried to overthrow Déby in 2004, and former General Seby Aguid. Minister of Communications and Culture, and spokesperson for the government Hourmadji Moussa Doumngor said that the Erdimi brothers were captured, while other rebel soldiers fled. Security Minister Routouang Yoma Golom told reporters, "There are around 100 members of the military implicated in this coup who have been arrested. They will be brought to trial. ... The situation is totally under control and calm has returned. The head of state has personally gone several times to military camps to restore order." Golom said a military court will sentence them over the next one to two months while other plotters are sought in eastern Chad.

Déby’s plane was departing from Bata, Equatorial Guinea, where he was attending a CEMAC summit with other Central African leaders, and was destined for N'Djamena, Chad.

According to Doumngor, the rebel soldiers fled in seven vehicles after soldiers loyal to the president foiled their attempt. Two of the vehicles were stopped and "their occupants neutralized". The remaining vehicles fled into the eastern part of the country while pursued by Chadian forces. Doumngor also stated that those who organised the coup were former military or civilian government officials living in Burkina Faso, Cameroon, the Sudan, and the United States.

There were also reports that on March 14 and March 15 N'Djamena’s two mobile phone networks were shut down. The government usually interferes with communications during security operations. Chadian rebels said that they would attempt to block the May 3 election. Doumgor responded in saying the elections will not be postponed.

Reaction

French Foreign Ministry spokesman Jean-Baptiste Mattei said the French were "following the situation with the greatest vigilance, given that Chad is going through a difficult situation because of the Darfur crisis."

Yaya Dillo Djérou, member of Platform for Change, Unity and Democracy, a subgroup of the UFDC, said the UFDC had tried to "smoke out the president from N'Djamena, but our plan was declared by some secret agents and then our people had to cancel the plan and get out of the town." Djérou was speaking in eastern Chad.

Suliman Baldo, Africa program director of the International Crisis Group think tank, said that "the calendar is really driving events ... the armed groups bent on toppling him don't want him to get to the elections."

The African Union issued a statement: "The President of the Commission of the African Union (AU) has strongly condemned the attempted coup d'état that has taken place in N'Djamena, Chad, in the night between March 14 and March 15, 2006. Conformly to the Algiers Decision of July 1999 and the Lomé Declaration of July 2000 on changes of government by unconstitutional means, the President of the Commission has reiterated the AU's opposition to all taking power by violent means. The President of the Commission has launched an appeal to Chadian politicians so that they use dialogue to sort out their differences and promote the democratic process in their country."

Reassurances by Déby
On March 18 Libyan leader Muammar Gaddafi phoned President Déby, who reassured Gaddafi that "The situation in Chad is under control."

See also
Chadian coup of 1975
Chadian-Sudanese conflict
Government of Chad
History of Chad
United Front for Democratic Change

References

Conflicts in 2006
Political history of Chad
Coup d'état attempt
Chad
Attempted coups d'état in Chad
Military history of Chad
Military coups in Chad
March 2006 events in Africa